Raymond William Froggatt (born 13 November 1941) is an English songwriter and singer.

Biography

Froggatt (otherwise known as "Froggy") was born in Bordesley Green, Birmingham. He began performing rock and roll in the early 1960s before moving on to focus on Country and Western.  His band, initially known as the Buccaneers, later Monopoly and ultimately The Raymond Froggatt Band with guitarist Hartley Cain (H Cain), drummer Len Ablethorpe and whose bassist was Louis Clark of Electric Light Orchestra and Hooked on Classics fame, were signed by Polydor in 1964. However chart success eluded them, although the Dave Clark Five had a No. 7 hit in the UK Singles Chart with Froggatt's "The Red Balloon" in 1968. His own original version of the song, under the title "Callow-la-vita", reached No. 3 in the Netherlands.

Another Froggatt song, "Big Ship", was a No. 8 UK hit for Cliff Richard in 1969, and in the same year Froggatt's composition "Rachel" became a popular song in Australia and New Zealand, when it was released by the Australian artist Russell Morris.

In the 1970s, the band was managed by Don Arden, hoping to break into the United States music scene, but the experience led to the collapse of the band.

He later became an internationally recognised country music performer, releasing Here's to Everyone (1993) on his Red Balloon record label. Froggatt's autobiography, Raymond Who, followed in 1995.

He now lives in Horsehay, Telford, England.

Discography

 1968    The Voice And Writings Of Raymond Froggatt
 1972    Bleach
 1974    Rogues And Thieves
 1978    Southern Fried Frog
 1979    Songs From A Minstral
 1980    Stay With Me
 1982    Sooner Or Later
 1984    Why?
 1988    Is It Rollin' Bob
 1991    Here's To Everyone
 1993    At The London Palladium
 1995    Someday
 1996    The Collection
 1997    Moonshine
 1980    Runaway
 1998    Southern Fried Frog & Rogues And Thieves
 1998    In Concert At The Birmingham Town Hall
 1998    There Goes That Song Again
 1999    Now And Then
 2002    Milestones
 2003    Cold As A Landlord's Heart
 2003    Coast To Coast
 2003    Shantytown
 2004    The Voice And Writing Of Raymond Froggatt
 2004    Songland 40
 2004    Adaos
 2004    Just One Night In Concert Symphony Hall Birmingham
 2006    Dream Of You
 2007    Songwriter
 2007    The Lights Of Amsterdam
 2010    Songs With Reasons
 2010    Warm Days Summer Nights
 2011    Blue And Gold
 2011    America
 2011    Fields Of Rock And Roll
 2012    Movin' On
 2013    Birmingham Rain
 2014    Closer To You
 2015    The Classic Collection Vol 2
 2018    In Concert (Hunstanton & Birmingham)

References

External links
 Official Website
 H Cain
 

English male singers
1941 births
Living people
People from Telford